Ellis is an unincorporated community in Gage County, Nebraska, United States.

History
Ellis was named for John R. Ellis, a local banker. A post office was established in Ellis in 1887, and remained in operation until it was discontinued in 1958.

References

Unincorporated communities in Gage County, Nebraska
Unincorporated communities in Nebraska